William Seymour Blackstone (1809–1881) was an English MP in the Parliament of the United Kingdom.

He was the son of James Blackstone, barrister-at-law of the Middle Temple, and grandson of the legal writer William Blackstone (1723–1780). Elected Conservative MP for Wallingford, Oxfordshire, England in 1832, he served until 1852, when the constituency refused to re-adopt him. He defended the Corn Laws, and was one of the rebels who opposed Robert Peel over Free Trade in 1846, causing the fall of the government. Like his grandfather, he was staunchly anti-Roman Catholic.

He lived at Castle Priory, Wallingford, built for his grandfather, but decided to build a still-grander house, Howbery Park, across the Thames in Crowmarsh Gifford. However, he fell into debt, largely because of the costs of building this new home, and spent time in the debtors' prison at Oxford. His debt problems also contributed to the end of his political career. He died in Brighton, never having lived at Howbery Park.

References
Sephton, Robert S. (2003) William Seymour Blackstone (1809-1881) a Wallingford M.P.

External links 
 

1809 births
1881 deaths
Conservative Party (UK) MPs for English constituencies
People from Wallingford, Oxfordshire
UK MPs 1832–1835
UK MPs 1835–1837
UK MPs 1837–1841
UK MPs 1841–1847
UK MPs 1847–1852
Members of the Parliament of the United Kingdom for Wallingford